937 Bethgea is a background asteroid from the inner region of the asteroid belt. It was discovered on 12 September 1920 by German astronomer Karl Wilhelm Reinmuth, from Heidelberg.

Photometric observations of this asteroid made at the Torino Observatory in Italy during 1990–1991 were used to determine a synodic rotation period of 8.356 ± 0.006 hours.

References

External links 
 
 

000937
Discoveries by Karl Wilhelm Reinmuth
Named minor planets
000937
19200912